Valuyki is a town in Belgorod Oblast, Russia, located at the confluence of the Valuy and Oskol Rivers,  east of Belgorod and 15 km north of Russia–Ukraine border. Population:

Geography

Climate

History

Valuyki was founded in 1593 as a fortress for protection against the Crimean and Nogai Tatar raids along the Muravsky Trail.

In early September 2015 Reuters reported that Russia was building a new army base 'near Valuyki, a small town not far from Soloti.' Established in connection with the war in Ukraine, the base was to have barracks for 3,500 soldiers.  During the Russian invasion of Ukraine there were reports that Ukrainian artillery shelled the base of the Russian 3rd Motor Rifle Division in September 2022.

Administrative and municipal status
Within the framework of administrative divisions, Valuyki serves as the administrative center of Valuysky District, even though it is not a part of it. As an administrative division, it is incorporated separately as the town of oblast significance of Valuyki—an administrative unit with the status equal to that of the districts. As a municipal division, the town of oblast significance of Valuyki, together with three rural localities in Yablonovsky Rural Okrug of Valuysky District, is incorporated within Valuysky Municipal District as Valuyki Urban Settlement.

Notable people
 Aleksandr Kokorin (1991) — Russian professional football player

References

Notes

Sources

Cities and towns in Belgorod Oblast
Valuysky Uyezd
Populated places established in 1593